August 14 - Eastern Orthodox liturgical calendar - August 16

All fixed commemorations below are observed on August 28 by Eastern Orthodox Churches on the Old Calendar.

For August 15, Orthodox Churches on the Old Calendar commemorate the saints listed on August 2.

Feasts

 The Dormition of Our Most Holy Lady the Theotokos and Ever-Virgin Mary.

Pre-Schism Western saints

 Martyr Tarcisius, at Rome, seized by a heathen mob and preferred to die rather than expose the sacred mysteries to profanation (c. 253–260)  (see also: August 14 - Greek)
 Saint Alypius of Thagaste, Bishop of Tagaste in North Africa (c. 430)
 Saint Altfrid, Bishop of Hildesheim, was devoted to the Mother of God (874)
 Saint Arduinus, a priest in Rimini in Italy who lived as a hermit and ended his days in the monastery of San Gudenzio (1009)

Post-Schism Orthodox saints

 Venerable Macarius the Roman, Abbot (1550)
 Saint Chariton of Novgorod (16th century), disciple of St. Macarius the Roman.
 New Hieromartyr Christos, Hieromonk, of Ioannina (c. 1770)
 Saint Stephen, Elder, of Vyatka (1890)

New martyrs and confessors

 New Hieromartyr Andrew Voliansky, Priest (1919)
 New Hieromartyr Paul Szwajko, Priest, and New Martyr Joanna, Presvytera, of Graboviec (Chelm and Podlasie, Poland) (1943)

Other commemorations

 Commemoration of the Miracle of the Theotokos at the Siege of Constantinople (717–18).
 Repose of Elder Anthony of Murom (Arsenius in schema) (1851), friend of St. Seraphim of Sarov.
 Repose of Archimandrite Hieron, founder of New Athos (1912)
 Repose of Blessed George Lazar of Văratec, Romania (1916)
 Repose of Abbess Ruffina of Harbin and Shanghai (1937)
 Repose of Venerable Elder Joseph the Hesychast, of New Skete, Mt. Athos (1959) (see: August 16)
 Repose of Metropolitan Augustinos (Kantiotis) of Florina (2010)

Icons

 Icons of the Theotokos' Dormition:
 'Kiev Caves' (1073); 
 'Ovinov' (1425); 
 'Pskov-Caves' (1472); 
 'Semigorodnaya' (15th century); 
 'Seven Cities'; 
 'Pyukhtitsa' (16th century); 
 'Bakhchisarai'.

 Her Icons:
 'Atskurskaya' (1st century); 
 'Tsilkani' in Georgia (4th century); 
 'Vladimir-Rostov' (12th century); 
 'Mozdok' (13th century); 
 'Gaenatskaya' (13th century); 
 'Chukhlom' (14th century); 
 'Surdyeg' (1530); 
 'Tupichev' (17th century); 
 'Blachernae' (Georgia).

 Her Icons:
 'Diasozousa'; 
 'Chajnicke'.

 Icon of Sophia, the Wisdom of God (Novgorod).

Icon gallery

Notes

References

Sources
 August 15 / August 28. Orthodox Calendar (PRAVOSLAVIE.RU).
 August 28 / August 15. Holy Trinity Russian Orthodox Church (A parish of the Patriarchate of Moscow).
 August 15. OCA - The Lives of the Saints.
 The Autonomous Orthodox Metropolia of Western Europe and the Americas (ROCOR). St. Hilarion Calendar of Saints for the year of our Lord 2004. St. Hilarion Press (Austin, TX). p. 60.
 Menologion: The Fifteenth Day of the Month of August. Orthodoxy in China.
 August 15. Latin Saints of the Orthodox Patriarchate of Rome.
 The Roman Martyrology. Transl. by the Archbishop of Baltimore. Last Edition, According to the Copy Printed at Rome in 1914. Revised Edition, with the Imprimatur of His Eminence Cardinal Gibbons. Baltimore: John Murphy Company, 1916. p. 244.
 Rev. Richard Stanton. A Menology of England and Wales, or, Brief Memorials of the Ancient British and English Saints Arranged According to the Calendar, Together with the Martyrs of the 16th and 17th Centuries. London: Burns & Oates, 1892. pp. 394–395.

 Greek Sources
 Great Synaxaristes:  15 ΑΥΓΟΥΣΤΟΥ. ΜΕΓΑΣ ΣΥΝΑΞΑΡΙΣΤΗΣ.
  Συναξαριστής. 15 Αυγούστου. ECCLESIA.GR. (H ΕΚΚΛΗΣΙΑ ΤΗΣ ΕΛΛΑΔΟΣ).

 Russian Sources
  28 августа (15 августа). Православная Энциклопедия под редакцией Патриарха Московского и всея Руси Кирилла (электронная версия). (Orthodox Encyclopedia - Pravenc.ru).

August in the Eastern Orthodox calendar